The 2013 season is LionsXII's 2nd season in the Malaysia Super League. LionsXII won their first MSL title.

LionsXII were set a target of finishing top five for the 2013 Malaysia Super League. Five senior players, namely Shahril Ishak, Isa Halim, Fazrul Nawaz, Irwan Shah and Baihakki Khaizan were included in the 29-men squad to guide the younger players. Other key players such as Shahdan Sulaiman and Shaiful Esah no longer featured. The main aim was to develop the U–23 players and prepare them for the upcoming 2013 Southeast Asian Games that would be held at the end of the year.

Malaysia Super League

LionsXII began their campaign by defeating ATM FA 1–0 away. Subsequently, they vanquished the nation's traditional rivals Selangor FA. However, LionsXII stumbled to three losses against lowly T-Team FC and PKNS FC away. One sent them crashing out of the 2013 Malaysia FA Cup. In a turn of events, LionsXII went on a long unbeaten streak, securing important wins over Pahang FA (3–0), Kelantan FA (1–0), and ATM FA (3–1) at home.

On 2 July 2013, a 4–0 win over relegation-threatened FELDA United FC in the penultimate league game made LionsXII league champions. Singapore's Prime Minister, Lee Hsien Loong was present for the match played in front of a sold-out crowd at the Jalan Besar Stadium. The MSL trophy was also brought to the stadium as the LionsXII received it on home soil after the final whistle. LionsXII became the first foreign team to win the MSL, adding to the four Malaysian league titles it had won in 1979, 1981, 1985, and 1994. The title run was defined by a combination of good defence (15 goals conceded, the best record in the MSL) and goals from set-pieces (17 out of 32). The club chalked up their best home record (10 wins and 1 draw) in the league, making Jalan Besar Stadium a fortress.

The news of V. Sundramoorthy leaving to helm Negeri Sembilan FA was confirmed on 7 October 2013. On 13 October, the Football Association of Singapore posted an advertisement openly to recruit the succeeding LionsXII coach. Former Johor Darul Takzim coach and ex-Singapore international Fandi Ahmad is speculated to take over the position. Other candidates include former Warriors FC coach Richard Bok and Liverpool F.C. stalwart Steve McMahon.

Final standings

Malaysia FA Cup

Following inclement weather and a water-logged pitch, the match against PKNS was abandoned in the 38th minute with PKNS leading 1–0. The scoreline was reset for the rescheduled match but the teams had to submit the same starting line-ups. LionsXII were forced to bring on two substitutes in Faris Azienuddin and Izzdin Shafiq in the first minute as initial players Faritz Hameed and Shahril Ishak were unavailable. Raihan Rahman was dismissed for a second yellow card in the 24th minute with his first caution from the abandoned match carrying over. Fauzan Dzulkifli scored the only goal in the match to knock the Lions out of the competition.

Malaysia Cup

On 27 July, LionsXII were drawn into Group D for the 2013 Malaysia Cup with Perak FA, Sarawak FA and Kedah FA. They drew Kedah (2–2) in Singapore and succumbed to two collapses against Perak (1–0) and Sarawak (2–1). With those results, they nearly bowed out of the tournament. At that time, coach V. Sundramoorthy was rumoured to leave LionsXII at the end of the season to take charge of Malaysian Premier League side Negeri Sembilan FA.On the contrary, LionsXII eked out three victories (2–1 versus Perak, 1–0 versus Sarawak and 3–1 versus Kedah which marked the biggest away accomplishment of the season) out of the three remaining games to progress to the next round.

On 28 September, LionsXII narrowed a 1–0 victory over ATM FA in the first leg of the quarter-finals of the 2013 Malaysia Cup but squandered to a 1–4 mauling to the Gladiators in the return tie on 4 October.

Squad statistics

 Five senior players aged 23 and over were included in the 2013 squad.

Statistics accurate as of match played 4 October 2013

References

LionsXII seasons
Lions
2013 in Malaysian football